The 1924 Idaho Vandals football team represented the University of Idaho in the 1924 college football season, and were led by third-year head coach Robert L. Mathews. It was Idaho's third year in the Pacific Coast Conference and they were  overall; their  record in conference led the PCC in wins.

Home games were played on campus in Moscow at MacLean Field, with one in Boise at Public School Field. Conference champion Stanford was played at Multnomah Field in Portland, Oregon.

Idaho defeated neighbor Washington State again in the Battle of the Palouse, the second of three consecutive wins over the Cougars in the rivalry.

The four PCC wins were the most ever for Idaho; their next best total was two, achieved six times, last in 1938.

Schedule

 The Little Brown Stein trophy for the Montana game debuted fourteen years later in 1938
 Two games were played on Friday (Washington State and Oregon Agricultural),and the finale against Nevada in Boise was on Thursday (Thanksgiving)

References

External links
Gem of the Mountains: 1925 University of Idaho yearbook – 1924 football season 
Go Mighty Vandals – 1924 football season
Idaho Argonaut – student newspaper – 1924 editions

Idaho
Idaho Vandals football seasons
Idaho Vandals football